Forgotten Women is a 1931 American drama film directed by Richard Thorpe and starring Marion Shilling, Beryl Mercer and Rex Bell. It was distributed by Monogram Pictures, one of the leading studios outside the majors.

Synopsis
Aspiring actress Patricia Young is struggling to make a living as a Hollywood extra. Along with her newspaper reporter boyfriend Jimmy, she discovers the activities of a crooked producer. This leads to a promotion to him, but his head seems to be turned by the daughter of his newspaper's owner. Patricia is advised by fellow extra and former star Fern Madden who lives in the same boarding house.

Cast
 Marion Shilling as Patricia Young
 Beryl Mercer as 	Fern Madden
 Rex Bell as 	Jimmy Burke
 Virginia Lee Corbin as Sissy Salem
 Carmelita Geraghty as Helen Turner
 Edna Murphy as 	Trixie de Forrester
 Edward Earle as 	Sleek Moran
 Jack Carlyle as 	Tony Dugan
 Eddie Kane as 	Mose Swineback
 Gordon De Main as Walrus 
 William Beaudine as 	Director 
 Thomas A. Curran as 	Mr. Turner 
 Billy Franey as 	Mr. Flanagan - Ice Man 
 Gordon Griffith as 	Movie Cameraman 
 William H. O'Brien as 	Sleek's Butler 
 Dorothy Vernon as 	Landlady 
 Charles Williams as 	Jerry - Stagehand

References

Bibliography
 Lussier, Tim. "Bare Knees" Flapper: The Life and Films of Virginia Lee Corbin. McFarland, 2018.

External links
 

1931 films
1931 drama films
1930s English-language films
American drama films
Monogram Pictures films
American black-and-white films
Films directed by Richard Thorpe
1930s American films
Films about filmmaking
Films set in Los Angeles